Gutch may refer to:

People
 Eliza Gutch (1840-1931), English author.
 George Gutch, British architect.
 John Gutch (clergyman) (1746–1831), Anglican clergyman and official of the University of Oxford. 
 John Gutch (colonial administrator), British colonial administrator.
 John Mathew Gutch (1776-1861), English journalist and historian.
 John Wheeley Gough Gutch (1809–1862), British surgeon and editor.

Other
 Gutch Common, Site of Special Scientific Interest in Wiltshire, England.

See also
 Gutch (surname)